Crassispira scala is a species of sea snail, a marine gastropod mollusk in the family Pseudomelatomidae.

Description
The length of the shell varies between 15 mm and 30 mm.

Distribution
This marine species occurs off the Philippines, Papua New Guinea, New Caledonia, Vanuatu and Micronesia

References

 Kantor Y.I., Stahlschmidt P., Aznar-Cormano L., Bouchet P. & Puillandre N. (2017). Too familiar to be questioned? Revisiting the Crassispira cerithina species complex (Gastropoda: Conoidea: Pseudomelatomidae). Journal of Molluscan Studies. 83 (1): 43-55

External links
 Gastropods.com: Crassispira scala
 

scala
Gastropods described in 2017